is a single by Japanese singer-songwriter Chiaki Ishikawa. "Uninstall" and "Little Bird" are known as the theme songs for the anime Bokurano: Ours. "Uninstall" reached the number 13 spot on the Oricon's weekly charts, remaining on the charts for a total of 16 weeks.

"Uninstall"'s popularity in the Japanese Internet communities led to its constant inclusion in the Kumikyoku Nico Nico Douga mashups.

Track listing

References

Further reading

External links
 

2007 singles
Anime songs